Magic Rhythm is the debut studio album by Australian pop singer Christie Allen. The album peaked at No.59 on the Australian charts. It featured two top 5 singles.

Track listing

Charts

Certifications

References 

1979 debut albums
Mushroom Records albums
Christie Allen albums